Tairov is a village in Armavir province, Armenia.

Tairov may also refer to:

Places
Tairove, urban settlement in the Ovidiopol Raion, Odessa Oblast (province) of southern Ukraine

People
Alexander Tairov (1885–1950), theatre director
Abdimajit Tairov (born 1974), Uzbekistan football defender
Vasiliy Tairov (1859-1938), аrmenian and soviet scientist, professor
 (1900—1941), soviet aircraft designer

Aircraft series
Tairov OKO-1, passenger transport aircraft produced in the Ukrainian SSR in the USSR in 1937
Tairov OKO-4, attack aircraft produced in the Ukrainian SSR in the USSR in 1939
Tairov OKO-7, heavy fighter produced in the Ukraine region of the USSR in 1940
Tairov Ta-3, twin-engined single-seat escort fighter designed and produced in the Ukrainian SSR in the USSR from 1939

See also
Tairo (disambiguation)